Brent Maddock is an American screenwriter, producer and film director who has worked with S. S. Wilson on several high-profile projects such as Short Circuit (1986), Batteries Not Included (1987), Tremors (1990) and Wild Wild West (1999). Maddock is a founding partner of Stampede Entertainment.

Filmography

References

External links

Living people
Year of birth missing (living people)
American film directors
American film producers
American male screenwriters
American horror writers
20th-century American male writers
Place of birth missing (living people)
20th-century American writers